The Martigny–Orsières Railway (Chemin de fer Martigny–Orsières; MO) was a railway company in the Canton of Valais in Switzerland. It merged in 2000 with the Martigny-Châtelard Railway (Chemin de fer Martigny-Châtelard, MC) to form Transports de Martigny et Régions (TMR). The MO's line consisted of the 19 km-long line from Martigny via Sembrancher to Orsières in the Val d’Entremont and the 6 km-long branch line from Sembrancher to Le Châble in the Val de Bagnes.

History

The MO was granted a concession to build a standard gauge line from Martigny to Orsières in 1906. The railway company was established as a result of British Aluminium's plan to build an aluminum plant in Orsières. The ground-breaking ceremony was held on 23 July 1907 and operations commenced on 1 September 1910. The railway has been electrified at 8000 V 15 Hz AC since the beginning of operations. Traffic remained modest because neither the aluminium works nor the planned connection to the Aosta Valley were built. The MO was one of the first railway companies to supplement its rail activity with bus operations. The railway was later nationalised.
 

The line was converted to SBB's 15 kV AC railway electrification system on 4 March 1949. This meant that traction vehicles of the SBB could also be used on the MO. The branch line from Sembrancher to Le Châble was opened on 5 August 1953 and served the construction of the Mauvoisin power station. The cement trains were hauled by SBB locomotives.
 
Originally goods traffic dominated operations on the MO. Since the 1970s, growing tourism has led to increased passenger traffic.
 
Two ABDe 4/4 railcars (6 and 8) collided front on at Martigny-Bourg on 1 September 1984. The train driver started towards Orsières despite the exit signal being at danger. The driver and five passengers were killed and 24 people were injured. The two railcars were rebuilt. The destroyed Bt 31 control car was replaced by a similar vehicle from the Régional du Val-de-Travers (RVT).
 
The MO merged with the Martigny-Châtelard Railway to form the Transports de Martigny et Régions (TMR) on 1 January 2000.

Rolling stock
To start operations, MO procured two BCFe 4/4 passenger railcars (1–2) and two CFe 4/4 luggage railcars (11–12) with folding seats for passenger services. All four vehicles had the same electrical equipment with repulsion motors. The railcars were completely rebuilt with the conversion of the power system in 1949. BCFe 4/4 passenger railcars (3–4) were converted from the two baggage railcars.
 
The railcars were supplemented with ABDe 4/4 5 in 1955. A comprehensive renewal of the rolling stock took place from 1962 to 1965. The MO procured three ABDe 4/4 EAV (Eidgenössischen Amt für Verkehr—"Federal Office of Transport") railcars (6–8), three associated Bt control cars (31–33) and two standard passenger coaches (Einheitspersonenwagen). In 1983, a fourth, identical railcar was acquired from the Régional du Val-de-Travers (RVT) and classified in the rolling stock fleet as ABDe 4/4 9. The EAV motor coaches later received the designation ABDe 537 506–509.
 
The NINA railcar RABe 527 511–513, which had already been procured by the successor company TMR, has been in use on the MO lines since 2002.

Operations

The hourly Saint-Bernard Express takes 26 minutes to get from Martigny to Le Châble, from where it is possible to take the Postauto or the cable car to the resort of Verbier.
 
In Sembrancher, a second set provides connections to Orsières. From there, TMR bus services continue to Champex, Val Ferret or the Great St Bernard Pass.

References

Footnotes

Sources
 

Standard gauge railways in Switzerland
Railway lines opened in 1910
Defunct railway companies of Switzerland
Railway companies established in 1910
Railway companies disestablished in 2000
Swiss companies established in 1910
Swiss companies disestablished in 2000